The Lava Cap Mine is an abandoned gold mine in Nevada County, California. The site is undergoing cleanup by the United States Environmental Protection Agency for arsenic contamination.

History
Gold and silver mining began on site in 1861, with an inactive period from 1918 to 1934. In 1934 mining restarted under the Lava Cap Gold Mining Corporation.
Beginning in 1940, a gold cyanidation plant operated on site to leech residual gold from the mine tailings. The gold cyanidation  process increased yield to 95 percent of the gold contained in the mine's ore.
At the time of its closure, the Lava Cap Mine was the most productive in California, with over 300 men. In 1943 mining ceased due to World War II and did not resume. 
 

In 1952, Lava Cap Gold Mining Corporation, including the mine itself, was acquired by Sterling CentreCorp, and in 1989 the site was acquired by developer Stephen Elder. 

A dam failure in 1997 caused a spill of arsenic-rich tailings, leading to an investigation by the EPA.  Remedial action began in 2005.  In 2018, a $32 million judgement was obtained against Elder and Sterling CentreCorp, related to cleanup costs.

Environmental issues
During a January 1997 storm, the log dam collapsed, releasing 10,000 cubic yards of arsenic-rich tailings downstream into the Little Clipper Creek and watershed, including Lost Lake. Samples of contaminated material contained 100 to 2,200 milligrams of arsenic per kilogram

Health concerns
EPA tests revealed elevated levels of arsenic in Little Clipper Creek, Lost Lake, shallow groundwater, and in drinking water wells.

Arsenic has been classified as a carcinogen and causes other severe health issues, including thickening skin, pain, nausea, paralysis, and blindness.  

Residents are advised to limit their exposure to mine tailings, and to wash their shoes and pets after walking in contaminated areas.

Superfund designation
In February 1999, the Lava Cap Mine was added to the EPA's National Priorities List, allowing Superfund resources to be allocated for the site's cleanup.  The cleanup was divided into 4 operable units (OUs)
OU1 focused on removal and relocation of tailings and contaminated materials (more than 20 milligrams per kilogram) to a location north of the site.  Material that was part of roadways were paved entirely with asphalt.  The tailings pile was covered by waste rock and sealed with clay.  Streams were routed around the tailings pile.  Water draining from mine adits were treated with iron compounds to precipitate out arsenic solids.  OU1 was completed in 2016. 
OU2 provided affected residences with water treatment units and started construction on a drinking water pipeline.
OU3 testing is currently being conducted to determine a cost-effective method of treating surface water in the Little Clipper Creek watershed.
OU4 demolished residences on the mine property.

References

Nevada County, California
Gold mines in California
United States Environmental Protection Agency